Raynell Williams (born February 4, 1989 in Cleveland, Ohio) is an American professional boxer who as an amateur, won several national championships and represented team USA at the 2008 Summer Olympics.

Amateur career
Southpaw counterpuncher Williams who hails from Ohio started boxing in 2001.
He won the silver medal at the National Golden Gloves 2007 after losing to aggressive 16-year-old Hylon Williams (2-3).
At the US championships in June, however, he bested the other Williams (31-21) in the semifinals and Rico Ramos (16-9), in finals.

At the US Olympic trials he edged out his nemesis Hylon Williams two out of three in close bouts (24-22), (16-20) and (17-16).

At the world championships 2007 he upset Olympian Khedafi Djelkhir of France and another fighter to qualify for Beijing but was defeated by Russian Albert Selimov.

At the Olympics 2008 he lost the rematch with Djelkhir.

At the 2012 Olympic Trials he lost in the finals to Jose Ramírez 21–16.

World Championships results 
2007 World Championships
Defeated Khedafi Djelkhir (France) 28-18
Defeated Maksat Ospanov (Kazakhstan) 28-9
Defeated Azat Hovhanesyan (Armenia) RSCO 3
Lost to Albert Selimov (Russia) 8-25

Olympic Games results 
2008 Summer Olympics
Defeated Alessio di Savino (Italy) 9:1
Lost to Khedafi Djelkhir (France) 7:9

Professional career
He signed professional with boxing advisor Al Haymon in the summer of 2013 and made his professional debut on July 5, 2013 defeating Dwight Ellis via TKO in the first round. He ran his record to 12–0, with 6 knockouts, before facing fellow undefeated fighter Joshua Zuniga in December 2017. Zuniga knocked Williams out in round 4 of a scheduled 8 rounder, and as of 2019 Williams has not fought since.

References

External links 
 USA boxing bio
 Raynell Williams Amateur Boxing Record
 sports-reference

1989 births
Living people
Featherweight boxers
African-American boxers
Winners of the United States Championship for amateur boxers
Boxers at the 2008 Summer Olympics
Olympic boxers of the United States
American male boxers
Boxers from Cleveland
21st-century African-American sportspeople
20th-century African-American people